Carla Accardi (9 October 1924 – 23 February 2014) was an Italian abstract painter associated with the Arte Informel and Arte Povera movements, and a founding member of the Italian art groups Forma (1947) and Continuità (1961).

Biography
Born in the city of Trapani in Sicily, Carla Accardi studied at the Accademia di Bella Arti in Palermo and Florence prior to moving to Rome in 1946.  She founded the art group Forma in 1947 with fellow artists Pietro Consagra (1920-2005), Ugo Attardi (1923-2006), Antonio Sanfilippo (1923-1980), Giulio Turcato (1912-1995), Piero Dorazio (1927-2005), Achille Perilli, and Mino Guerrini, an Italian screenwriter, director, actor and painter. Accardi married Sanfilippo in 1949. Work in Forma was inspired by futurism Forma 1 had their first exhibition in Rome in 1947. Forma later helped lead to the development of movimento arte concreta.  Accardi's work became well known in France where the art critic Michel Tapie took an interest in her work.

Work 
Accardi's earliest paintings were self-portraits, but her move to Rome prompted more experimental work. In 1946, she joined the Italian avant-garde movement. In the 1960s, Accardi started making her first paintings in black and white, focusing on monochromy, color, and shapes. The inspiration for her black and white paintings came from visiting Paris during her one-woman shows. There the contrasting static and energetic work of Alberto Magnelli and Hans Hartung inspired her to begin painting in black and white. These black and white paintings were referred to as her “Integrazione series”

She transitioned to vibrant and intense colors in the mid-1960s, with Stella and II Stella (Star I and II). She also began using a clear plastic material called Sicofoil, which she describes as "like something luminous, a mixing and a fluidity with the surrounding environment: perhaps in order to take away the totemic value of the painting." She used this material to make Tendas, or tents of clear plastic, which she adorned with painted forms. After being exposed to these different forms of art, such as black and white painting and Sicofoil, she adopted greater variety of color once she reverted to canvas painting.

During the late 1970s, she became part of the feminist movement with critic Carla Lonzi. Together, they founded Rivolta femminile in 1970, one of Italy's first feminist groups and publishing houses. Accardi is considered a key member of the Italian avant-garde and her artwork influenced the Arte Povera movement in the late 1960s. Accardi's first solo exhibition in the United States was in 2001 at MoMA PS1.

Known works include: 
1960
Bianco nero su turchese (1960), Azzurroviolarancio (1962), Bozetto Bronzo (1964), Segni Rosa and Verde (both 1968), Segni Rosa (1971), Per L'Infinito lo Scirocco (1987), Apparenti Tinte (1990), Grigio Rosso (1992), Verde Rosso (1997), Viola Arancio (2005), Blu (2007), Rosso du Grigio (2008), Senza Titulo (2011), L'Enigma dell'ora, Melodie Fluvial and Mistero en forme (2012).

Exhibitions
Solo exhibitions

2007
Galerie Greta Meert; Brussels
2004
Macro Museo d'Arte Contemporanea Roma; Rome, Italy
Galerie Meert Rihoux; Brussels, Belgium
2003
Carla Accardi- Opere recenti, Galleria Astuni; Pietrasanta, Italy
2002
Galerie Meert Rioux; Brussels
Galleria d'Arte Moderna di Ljubljana; Slovenia
Musee d'Art Moderne de la Ville de Paris; Paris
Carla Accardi, Galleria Pecci; Milan, Italy
2001
Triplice Tenda, P.S. 1 Contemporary Art Center; New York
Carla Accardi. Premio Artista dell'anno, Palazzo Crepadona; Belluno
Carla Accardi. Premio Artista dell'anno, Galleria Civica; Cortina d'Ampezzo
Carla Accardi Disegni, Galleria Santo Ficara; Florence
2000
Carla Accardi: Sicofoil, Galleria Massimo Minini; Brescia
Carla Accardi: Opere recenti, Galerie Meert; Rihoux, Brussels
Carla Accardi: Pietrose distanze, Galleria Astuni; Fano, Pesaro, Urbino
1999
Carla Accardi: Triplice Tenda, Kunstmuseum; Bonn
Transparences, Studio Simonis; Paris
1998
Carla Accardi: Triplice Tenda, Castello di Rivoli; Turin
Ambiente Arancio, Musee d-Art moderne et contemporain; Strasbourg, France
Carla Accardi: Opere 1947–1997, Chiesa della Badia Grande e Laboratori Officina; Trapani
Carla Accardi, Overbeck Gesellschaft; Lubeck, Germany
1997
Galleria Cesare Manso; Pescara, Italy
Galleria Vannuci; Pistoia, Italy
Atelier del Bosco a Villa Medici, Academie de France; Rome
Dove nasce il segno (oeuvres 1953) Studio Simonis; Paris
Carla Accardi: Ambiente arancio 1967, Telecarte, Galerie Meert; Rihoux, Brussels
1996
Stadtische Galerie; Wolfsburg
Galleria Fumagalli; Bergamo
1995
Kunstverein; Ludwishafen, Germany
Galleria delle Arti; Citta di Castello, Italy
Giochi galleggianti e trasparenze, Centro d'Arte Contemporanea Spazio Umano; Milan
1994
Una forma d'esistenza, Fumagalli Arte Contemporanea; Bergamo
Opere 1954–1993, Galerie Meert; Rihoux, Brussels
1950
 Carla Accardi. 15 Tempere Galleria Age d'Or; Rome, Italy

Group exhibitions

2007
Carla Accardi meets Lucio Fontana, Martha Herford; Germany
2006
Cenni e Barlumi, Galleria Massimo Minini; Brescia
Infinite Space, Carla Accardi e Lucio Fontana. Galleria Sperone Westwater; New York
Camere Chambers, Sound Art Museum; Rome
Italy made in art – Now, MOCA Shanghai; Shanghai
Venezia 1948-1986 - :a scena dell'arte, Peggy Guggenheim Collection; Venice
Immaginario Femminile, Gall. Biasutti & Biasutti; Torino
2005
Paintings 1955–2004, Sperone Westwater Gallery, New York and Casa italiana Zerrilli Marimo; New York University, USA
Segnali italiani dalla collezione d'Arte Contemporanea alla Farnesina, Galleria dell Accademia serba delle Scienze e delle Arti; Belgrado
Accardi Turcato. Carte, Galleria Santo Picara; Firenze
2004
Forma 1 e I suoi artisti, Riga, Casa delle Terre Nere; Lettonia
Capricci, Ex Pinacoteca Comunale; Assisi
Accardi castellani Asdruball, Il ritmo dei sedni gall. Santo Picara; Firenze
On Paper Carla Accardi, Francesco Impellizzeri, Gall, A.A.M. Architettura Arte Moderna; Rome
Da Balla alla Transavanguardia, Triennale; Milan
Carla Accardi, Valery Koshlyakov, Sissi, Macro, Rome Italy; Dorf in die Metropole Kunstlerhaus Bethanien, Berlin, Staatliche Kunsthalle Baden-Baden; Baden-Baden, Germany
2003
Si adagiarono sparse, Magazzino d'Arte Moderna; Rome
Incontri, Galleria Borghese; Rome
Galerie Meert Rihoux; Brussels
2002
TRE – generazioni a confronto III, L.I. Art Laboratorio Incontri d'Arte; Rome, Italy
2001
Camera Italia, Vistamare associazione culturale; Pescara
Visita Guidata, Calcografia Nazionale; Rome
Artisti italiani del XX Secolo alla Farnesina Ministero degli Affari Esteri; Rome
Italiens Klassische Moderne, Carla Accardi, Piero Dorazio, Achille Perilli, Frankfurter Westen Galerie; Frankfurt
Belvedere italiano, 1945–2001. Linee di tendenza dell'arte contemporanea; Warsaw
1989- Berliner Mauer Kunst fur ein Europa im Aufbruch, Wallraf-Richartz-Museum/Fondation Corboud Josef-Haubrich, Kunsthalle Koln; Cologne
2000
Miracoli a Milano 1955-1965 Artisti Gallerie Tendenze, Comune di Milano, Museo della Permanente; Milan
Wollways, Fondation Pistoletto; Paris
Novacento Arte e Storia in Italia, Scuderie Papali al Quirinale; Rome
Verso Sud, Palazzo Doria Pamphilj; Valmontone, Rome
Giganti, Scavi dei Fori Imperiali; Rome
Biennale de La Havane
Forma 1 e I suoi artisti, Galleria Comunale d'Arte Moderna e Contemporanea; Rome
Artisti Collezionisti, Palazzo delle Papesse Centro Arte Contemporanea; Siena
1999
L'ultimo Disegno del 1999, Zerynthia Associazione per l'Arte Contemporanea; Rome
Minimalia, P.S. 1 Contemporary Art Center; New York
Perhe?, presentazione del numero 1 della rivista, Fossa dei serpenti; Milan
Fondo Oro, Accardi, Gilardi, Ontani, Paolini, Salvatori, Salvo, Galleria Santo Ficara; Florence
Art Club 1945–1964, la linea astratta, Basilica Palladian di Vicenza; Vicenza
1947
Arte giovane italiana; Prague, Czech Republic

References

External links
 Biography of the artist Carla Accardi, at pontiart.com
 (IT) Exhibitions and Sales Market, at artemodernaitaliana.com

1924 births
2014 deaths
20th-century Italian women artists
21st-century Italian women artists
Italian contemporary artists
Italian women painters
Italian feminists
People from Trapani
Painters from Sicily